Yevhen Mykolayovych Zarichnyuk (born 3 February 1989) is a Ukrainian professional footballer who plays as a left midfielder.

External links
 
 
 

1989 births
Living people
Footballers from Kyiv
Ukrainian footballers
Association football midfielders
FC Nafkom Brovary players
FC Lviv players
FC Stal Alchevsk players
FC Stal-2 Alchevsk players
FC Obolon-Brovar Kyiv players
FC Desna Chernihiv players
FC Irpin Horenychi players
MFC Mykolaiv players
MFC Mykolaiv-2 players
FC Tiraspol players
FC Milsami Orhei players
FC Vorskla Poltava players
FC Volyn Lutsk players
FC Ahrobiznes Volochysk players
FC Rubikon Kyiv players
FC Olimpik Donetsk players
Ukrainian Premier League players
Ukrainian First League players
Ukrainian Second League players
Ukrainian Amateur Football Championship players
Moldovan Super Liga players
Ukrainian expatriate footballers
Expatriate footballers in Moldova
Ukrainian expatriate sportspeople in Moldova